Bastien Gallet (born 8 April 1980) is a French rower. He competed in the men's eight event at the 2004 Summer Olympics.

References

1980 births
Living people
French male rowers
Olympic rowers of France
Rowers at the 2004 Summer Olympics
Rowers from Paris